Dagoberto Quesada Beckle (born 6 October 1987) is a Cuban football midfielder.

Club career
Born in Camagüey, he plays for provincial team Camagüey.

International career
Quesada made his international debut for Cuba in an October 2010 friendly match against Panama and has earned a total of 7 caps, scoring no goals. He appeared in three matches with the Cuba national football team for the 2011 CONCACAF Gold Cup.

His final international was a June 2011 Gold Cup match against El Salvador.

References

External links
 

1987 births
Living people
Cuban footballers
Association football forwards
FC Camagüey players
Cuba international footballers
2011 CONCACAF Gold Cup players
Sportspeople from Camagüey